The Woolworth, F.W., Building was a historic department store building located in Lexington, Kentucky, that served as a retail location for the F. W. Woolworth Company from 1946 to 1990. It was designed by Frederick W. Garber.

The store was the site of protests during the Civil Rights Movement against segregation during the 1960s.

After 1990, the city government favored creating a business incubator on the site.  However, the building was demolished in 2004 and turned into a parking lot. As of 2022, the location is the City Center development which includes a Marriot hotel, restaurants and retail.

See also
 Greensboro sit-ins
 Laurel Homes, also by architect Frederick W. Garber
 Historic Woolworth's in Wilmington, Delaware
 National Register of Historic Places listings in Fayette County, Kentucky

References

External links
 NRHP Site Listing with Photos
 F.W. Woolworth at Abandoned
 Woolworth Museum

Commercial buildings completed in 1921
National Register of Historic Places in Lexington, Kentucky
Department stores on the National Register of Historic Places
Demolished buildings and structures in Kentucky
F. W. Woolworth Company buildings and structures
Frederick W. Garber buildings
Commercial buildings completed in 1946
Art Deco architecture in Kentucky
Commercial buildings on the National Register of Historic Places in Kentucky
Commercial buildings in Lexington, Kentucky
1946 establishments in Kentucky
2004 disestablishments in Kentucky
Civil rights movement
Demolished but still listed on the National Register of Historic Places